Emmeline Ndongue (born 25 April 1983 in Auxerre, France) is a French basketball player who played 196 games for the women's French national basketball team between 2002 and 2013 .

References

1983 births
Living people
Basketball players at the 2012 Summer Olympics
French expatriate basketball people in the United States
French sportspeople of Cameroonian descent
French women's basketball players
Knights of the Ordre national du Mérite
Los Angeles Sparks players
Medalists at the 2012 Summer Olympics
Olympic basketball players of France
Olympic medalists in basketball
Olympic silver medalists for France
Sportspeople from Auxerre
21st-century French women